Need for speed is a phrase showing a desire to go fast, usually in a vehicle, such as a race car; popularized in the 1986 film Top Gun. 

It may also refer to:

Need for Speed franchise
 Need for Speed is a racing video game franchise.
 The Need for Speed, a 1994 video game and the first installment in the Need for Speed franchise
 Need for Speed (film), a 2014 film based on the video game franchise and directed by Scott Waugh
 Need for Speed (2015 video game), a video game in the eponymous franchise developed by Ghost Games
 "The Need for Speed" (Legends of Tomorrow), an episode of Legends of Tomorrow

Other uses
 Michel Vaillant, a 2003 French racing film known as Need for Speed in the UK
 A photograph by Joseph McKeown of the Argentinian driver Fangio in the 1954 French Grand Prix

See also

 
 
 Need for Speed: Hot Pursuit (disambiguation)
 Need (disambiguation)
 Speed (disambiguation)